The lagomorphs are the members of the taxonomic order Lagomorpha, of which there are two living families: the Leporidae (hares and rabbits) and the Ochotonidae (pikas). The name of the order is derived from the Ancient Greek lagos (λαγώς, "hare") + morphē (μορφή, "form"). 
There are 110 recent species of lagomorph of which 109 are extant, including 34 species of pika, 42 species of rabbit, and 33 species of hare.

Taxonomy and evolutionary history 
Other names used for this order, now considered synonymous, include: Duplicidentata - Illiger, 1811; Leporida - Averianov, 1999; Neolagomorpha - Averianov, 1999; Ochotonida - Averianov, 1999; and Palarodentia - Haeckel, 1895, Lilian, 2016.

The evolutionary history of the lagomorphs is still not well understood. Until recently, it was generally agreed that Eurymylus, which lived in eastern Asia and dates back to the late Paleocene or early Eocene, was an ancestor of the lagomorphs. More recent examination of the fossil evidence suggests that the lagomorphs may have instead descended from Anagaloidea, also known as "mimotonids", while Eurymylus was more closely related to rodents (although not a direct ancestor). The leporids first appeared in the late Eocene and rapidly spread throughout the Northern Hemisphere; they show a trend towards increasingly long hind limbs as the modern leaping gait developed. The pikas appeared somewhat later in the Oligocene of eastern Asia.

Lagomorphs were certainly more diverse in the past than in the present, with around 75 genera and over 230 species represented in the fossil record and many more species in a single biome. This is evidence that lagomorph lineages are declining.

Recent finds suggest an Indian origin for the order, having possibly evolved in isolation when India was an island continent in the Paleocene.

Characteristics 
Lagomorphs are similar to other mammals in that they all have hair, four limbs (i.e., they are tetrapods), and mammary glands and are endotherms. Lagomorphs possess a moderately fused postorbital process to the cranium, unlike other small mammals. They differ in that they have a mixture of "basal" and "derived" physical traits.

Differences between lagomorphs and other mammals 
Despite the evolutionary relationship between lagomorphs and rodents, the two orders have some major differences: primarily, lagomorphs have four incisors in the upper jaw, whereas rodents (Rodentia) only have two. Also, lagomorphs are almost strictly herbivorous, unlike rodents, many of which will eat both meat and vegetable matter. They are similar to rodents in that their incisor teeth grow continuously throughout their lives, thus necessitating constant chewing on fibrous food to prevent the teeth from growing too long. Lagomorphs and rodents form the clade or grandorder Glires.

Lagomorphs have no paw pads; instead, the bottoms of their paws are entirely covered with fur.

Similarly to the rodents, bats, and some mammalian insectivores, they have a smooth-surfaced cerebrum.

Lagomorphs are unusual among terrestrial mammals in that the females are larger than males. This is extremely rare among terrestrial mammals.

Differences between families of lagomorphs 
Rabbits and hares move by jumping, pushing off with their strong hind legs and using their forelimbs to soften the impact on landing. Pikas lack certain skeletal modifications present in leporids, such as a highly arched skull, an upright posture of the head, strong hind limbs and pelvic girdle, and long limbs. Also, pikas have a short nasal region and entirely lack a supraorbital foramen, while leporids have prominent supraorbital foramina and nasal regions.

Pikas 

Pikas, also known as conies, are entirely represented by the family Ochotonidae and are small mammals native to mountainous regions of western North America, and Central Asia. Their four legs are nearly equal in length. Some species live in scree, making their homes in the crevices between broken rocks, while others construct burrows in upland areas. The rock-dwelling species are typically long-lived and solitary, having one or two small litters each year contributing to stable populations. The burrowing species, in contrast, are short-lived, gregarious and have multiple large litters during the year. These species tend to have large swings in population size. The gestation period of the pika is around one month long, and the newborns are altricial—they require parental care. The social behaviour of the two groups also differs: the rock dwellers aggressively maintain scent-marked territories, while the burrowers live in family groups, interact vocally with each other and defend a mutual territory. Pikas are diurnal and are active early and late in the day during hot weather. They feed on all sorts of plant material. As they do not hibernate, they make "haypiles" of dried vegetation which they collect and carry back to their homes to store for use during winter.

Hares 

Hares, members of genus Lepus of family Leporidae, are medium size mammals native to Europe, Asia, Africa, and North America. North American jackrabbits are actually hares. Although usually greyish-brown, some species turn white in the winter. They are solitary animals, and several litters of young are born, fully furred and active, during the year, in a nest called a form, a hollow in the ground amongst dense vegetation. They are preyed upon by large mammalian carnivores and birds of prey.

Rabbits 

Rabbits, members of family Leporidae outside Lepus, are generally much smaller than hares and include the rock hares and the hispid hare. They are native to Europe, parts of Africa, Central and Southern Asia, North America and much of South America. They inhabit both grassland and arid regions. The colour is some shade of brown, buff or grey and there is one black species and two striped ones. Domesticated rabbits come in a wider variety of colours. Newborn rabbits are less developed than hares and require parental care. Although most species live and breed in burrows, the cottontails and hispid hares have forms (nests). Most of the burrowing species are colonial, and may feed together in small groups. Rabbits play an important part in the terrestrial food chain, eating a wide range of forbs, grasses, and herbs, and being part of the staple diet of many carnivorous species. Many breeds of rabbit can be litter-trained, and—assuming they are given sufficient room to run—can live happy lives as house pets.

Distribution 
Lagomorphs are widespread around the world and inhabit every continent except Antarctica. However, they are not found in most of the southern cone of South America, in the West Indies, Indonesia or Madagascar, nor on many islands. Although they are not native to Australia, humans have introduced them there and they have successfully colonized many parts of the country and caused disruption to native species.

Biology

Digestion 

Like other herbivores, lagomorphs have to deal with a bulky diet in which the cell walls are composed of cellulose, a substance which mammalian digestive enzymes are unable to break down. Despite this, lagomorphs have developed a way of extracting maximum nourishment from their diet. First they bite off and shred plant tissues with their incisors and then they grind the material with their molars. Digestion continues in the stomach and small intestine where nutrients are absorbed. After that, certain food remains get diverted into the caecum, a blind-ended pouch. Here, they are mixed with bacteria, yeasts and other micro-organisms that are able to digest cellulose and turn it into sugar, a process known as hindgut fermentation. Other faecal matter passes along the colon and is excreted in the normal way as small, dry pellets. About four to eight hours after the meal, the contents of the caecum pass into the colon and are eliminated as soft, moist pellets known as cecotropes. These are immediately eaten by the lagomorph, which can thus extract all the remaining nutrients in the food.

Birth and early life 
Many lagomorphs breed several times a year and produce large litters. This is particularly the case in species that breed in underground, protective environments such as burrows. The altricial young of rabbits, called kits, are born naked and helpless after a short gestation period and the mother can become pregnant again almost immediately after giving birth. The mothers are able to leave these young safely and go off to feed, returning at intervals to feed them with their unusually rich milk. In some species, the mother only visits and feeds the litter once a day but the young grow rapidly and are usually weaned within a month. Hares live above ground and their litters, containing leverets, are born in "forms" concealed among tussocks and scrub. They have a strategy to prevent predators from tracking down their litter by following the adults' scent. They approach and depart from the nesting site in a series of immense bounds, sometimes moving at right angles to their previous direction. The young are precocial and a small number are born after a longer gestation period, already clad in short fur and able to move around.

Sociality and safety 
Many species of lagomorphs, particularly the rabbits and the pikas, are gregarious and live in colonies, whereas hares are generally solitary species, although many hares travel and forage in groups of two, three, or four. The rabbits and pikas rely on their holes as places of safety when danger threatens, but hares rely on their long legs, great speed and jinking gait to escape from predators.

Classification

Recent genera 
Order Lagomorpha Brandt 1885
Family Leporidae Fischer de Waldheim 1817 (rabbits and hares)
Subfamily Leporinae Trouessart 1880
Genus Brachylagus
Genus Bunolagus
Genus Caprolagus Blyth 1845
Genus Lepus Linnaeus 1758
Genus Nesolagus Forsyth Major 1899
Genus Oryctolagus Lilljeborg 1874
Genus Pentalagus Lyon 1904
Genus Poelagus
Genus Pronolagus Lyon 1904
Genus Romerolagus Merriam 1896
Genus Sylvilagus Gray 1867
Family Ochotonidae Thomas 1897 (pikas)
Genus Ochotona Link 1795
Genus †Prolagus Pomel 1853 (Considered by some bodies to be the sole member of the family Prolagidae)

Fossil genera 
 Order Lagomorpha Brandt 1885
 Family Leporidae Fischer de Waldheim 1817 (rabbits and hares)
 Subfamily † Archaeolaginae
Genus †Archaeolagus Dice 1917
Genus †Hypolagus Dice 1917
Genus †Notolagus Wilson 1938
Genus †Panolax Cope 1874
 Subfamily Leporinae Trouessart 1880
 Genus †Alilepus Dice 1931
 Genus †Nuralagus Lilljeborg 1874
 Genus †Pliolagus Kormos 1934
Genus †Pliosiwalagus Patnaik 2001
Genus †Pratilepus Hibbard 1939
Genus †Serengetilagus Dietrich 1941
 Subfamily †Palaeolaginae Dice 1929
Tribe †Dasyporcina Gray 1825
Genus †Coelogenys Illiger 1811
Genus †Agispelagus Argyropulo 1939
Genus †Aluralagus Downey 1968
Genus †Austrolagomys Stromer 1926
Genus †Aztlanolagus Russell & Harris 1986
Genus †Chadrolagus Gawne 1978
Genus †Gobiolagus Burke 1941
Genus †Lagotherium Pictet 1853
Genus †Lepoides White 1988
Genus †Nekrolagus Hibbard 1939
Genus †Ordolagus de Muizon 1977
Genus †Paranotolagus Miller & Carranza-Castaneda 1982
Genus †Pewelagus White 1984
Genus †Pliopentalagus Gureev & Konkova 1964
Genus †Pronotolagus White 1991
Genus †Tachylagus Storer 1992
Genus †Trischizolagus Radulesco & Samson 1967
Genus †Veterilepus Radulesco & Samson 1967
Tribe incertae sedis
Genus †Litolagus Dawson 1958
Genus †Megalagus Walker 1931
Genus †Mytonolagus Burke 1934
Genus †Palaeolagus Leidy 1856
 Family Ochotonidae Thomas 1897 (pikas)
 Genus †Alloptox Dawson 1961
Genus †Amphilagus Tobien 1974
Genus †Bellatona Dawson 1961
Genus †Cuyamalagus Hutchison & Lindsay 1974
Genus †Desmatolagus Matthew & Granger 1923
Genus †Gripholagomys Green 1972
Genus †Hesperolagomys Clark et al. 1964
Genus †Kenyalagomys MacInnes 1953
Genus †Lagopsis Schlosser 1894
Genus †Ochotonoides Teilhard de Jardin & Young 1931
Genus †Ochotonoma Sen 1998
Genus †Oklahomalagus Dalquest et al. 1996
Genus †Oreolagus Dice 1917
Genus †Piezodus Viret 1929
Genus †Russellagus Storer 1970
Genus †Sinolagomys Bohlin 1937
Genus †Titanomys von Meyer 1843
 Family incertae sedis
Genus †Eurolagus Lopez Martinez 1977
Genus †Hsiuannania Xu 1976
Genus †Hypsimylus Zhai 1977
Genus †Lushilagus Li 1965
Genus †Shamolagus Burke 1941

References 

 
Mammal orders
Extant Paleocene first appearances
Taxa named by Johann Friedrich von Brandt